Les Trois Lacs (in English: The Three Lakes) is a body of water shared between Les Sources Regional County Municipality, in Estrie, and Arthabaska Regional County Municipality, in administrative region of Centre-du-Québec. The body of water, divided into three units by points and bays, is located on the course of the Nicolet Southwest River.

Geography

Features 
Acting as a sedimentation basin for the Nicolet Southwest River, they have experienced a decrease in their volume since 1949. From 1975 to 2004, the estimated average depth loss was 20%.

Hydrography 
The Trois Lacs are 88% fed by the Nicolet Sud-Ouest river, while other small rivers and streams flow into it around its shores: the Second Ruisseau, the Monfette stream, the Trout stream and the Boutin watercourse. The median flow at the outlet varies between  depending on the period of the year.

Two thirds of the watershed is occupied by forest; agriculture occupies 30% and urban vocations about 3%.

The water quality is poor, with high concentrations of phosphorus. These concentrations, as well as those of other chemical compounds in lake water, indicate that they are in an advanced process of eutrophication, accelerated by activities of human origin: drainage, urbanization, agricultural practices and deforestation.

History 
The body of water appears on a map by Joseph Bouchette in 1831 under the name . The toponym "Les Trois Lacs" was formalized by the Government of Quebec on December 12, 1968.

References

External links 
 
 http://ville.asbestos.qc.ca/lac-trois-lacs-protection

Lakes of Estrie
Arthabaska Regional County Municipality
Lakes of Centre-du-Québec
Les Sources Regional County Municipality